Girlaukis ('wood-field') is a hamlet in Kėdainiai district municipality, in Kaunas County, in central Lithuania. According to the 2011 census, the settlement was uninhabited.

There was a forest ranger hut during the Soviet times.

Demography

References

Villages in Kaunas County
Kėdainiai District Municipality